Noordbarge is a neighbourhood and former village in Emmen in the province of Drenthe in the Netherlands

History 
Noordbarge was first mentioned in the 1380s as Berghe. The name means the north hill to distinguish itself from Zuidbarge. In 1840, it was home to 347 people. In 1978, the village was annexed by neighbouring Emmen, and has become a neighbourhood.

Gallery

References 

Populated places in Drenthe
Emmen, Netherlands